Lieutenant General Karl Friedrich von Steinmetz Franciscus (26 October 1768 in Silesia – 11 March 1837 in Potsdam) was a Prussian officer and cartographer who fought in the Napoleonic Wars. Steinmetz commanded a brigade in the Waterloo campaign. 
He was the uncle, and through his daughter Julie, father-in-law of the Field Marshal Karl Friedrich von Steinmetz.

Notes

Prussian Army personnel of the Napoleonic Wars
1768 births
1837 deaths
19th-century cartographers
Lieutenant generals of Prussia
Recipients of the Pour le Mérite (military class)